Bunbury Senior High School is a comprehensive public co-educational high day school, located in Bunbury, a regional centre in the South West region,  south of Perth, Western Australia.

History
The school was established in 1918 and in 2017 had an enrolment of 998 students from Year 7 to Year 12. The school magazine The Kingia was established in 1923. 
The school is the fourth oldest in the state, with many heritage listed buildings. They were designed in a Georgian Revival style by the Principal Architect of Western Australia, William Hardwick. The school is situated on Boulters Heights, one of the highest points of the city between the Indian Ocean and the central business district.

Bunbury was ranked as the top regional school in Western Australia in 2012, at position 32 in the state for students with a WACE score of 75 or more.

In June 2012 Bunbury Senior High School was severely damaged in a storm, with damage to its roof and ten classrooms. Many students continued their education at other local schools or sites until March 2013 when the school was able to access all the repaired classrooms.

Sports
The school won the champion school award in the Country Week carnival in 2009 for the first time since the school started competing in 1928. The school team was composed of 135 students in twelve teams competing in most sports.

The school won the Kim Hughes shield for the champion secondary school cricket team in Western Australia in 2009.

The school was champion school at Country Week in 2012 defeating the 2011 champions, Albany Senior High School, which came second, and cross town rivals Australind Senior High School, which came third. In 2013 Bunbury was again champion school.

Notable alumni
Bill MarmionMember of the Western Australian Parliament
Rex T. Prider (1910–2005)Professor of Geology, University of Western Australia (1949-1975)
John Sanderson 29th Governor of Western Australia, Lieutenant General Australian Army
David SherwoodRhodes Scholar
 John Cornell (1941–2021)Film producer, writer, actor and businessman

See also

 List of schools in rural Western Australia

References

External links

 

Public high schools in Western Australia
1918 establishments in Australia
State Register of Heritage Places in the City of Bunbury
Education in Bunbury, Western Australia